Baisha Township ("White sand") is a rural township in Penghu County (the Pescadores), Taiwan. The township has a population of 10,048.

Geography

The township is spread over 20 islands, including:
Baisha Main Island (Pe̍h-sua-tó)
Jibei Island(Kiat-puè-sū), former known as Jiabei Island (Ka-puà-sū)
Bird Island (Tsiáu-sū), the most densely populated island of Penghu, with 1,226 residents sharing an area of 
Chungtun (Zhongtun) Island (Tiong-tun-sū), former known as Zhongdun Island
Dacang Island (Tuā-tshng-sū)
Yuanbei Island(Înn-puà-sū)
Mudou Island(Ba̍k-táu-sū), former known as Modou Island
Tiejhen (Tiezhen) Island (Thih-tiam-sū)
Gupo Island(Koo-pô-sū)
Xianjiao Island(Hiám-ta-sū)

Administrative divisions
The township comprises 15 villages:
Chengcian/Chengqian
Chihkan/Chikan
Dacang
Gangzih/Gangzi
Houliao
Jiangmei
Jibei on Jibei Island
Niaoyu on Niau Island / Bird Island
Citou/Qitou
Tongliang
Watong
Siaochih/Xiaochi
Yuanbei on Yuanbei Island
Jhenhai/Zhenhai 
Jhongtun/Zhongtun on Zhongtun Island

Transportation
 Chikan Wharf
 Houliao Wharf 
 Jibei Wharf

Notable natives
 Chuang Chu Yu-nu, philanthropist

See also
 Penghu

References

External links
 繽紛澎湖-白沙 ('Thriving Penghu- Baisha')